San Juan Yucuita  is a town and municipality in Oaxaca in south-western Mexico. The municipality covers an area of 75.27 km².  It is a part of the Nochixtlán District in the southeast of the Mixteca Region.

As of 2005, the municipality had a total population of 656.

References

Municipalities of Oaxaca